Thiuram disulfides are a class of organosulfur compounds with the formula (R2NCSS)2. Many examples are known, but popular ones include R = Me and Et. They are disulfides obtained by oxidation of the dithiocarbamates.  These compounds are used in sulfur vulcanization of rubber as well as pesticides and drugs.  They are typically white or pale yellow solids that are soluble in organic solvents.

Preparation, structure, reactions
They are prepared by the oxidation of the salts of the corresponding dithiocarbamates (e.g. sodium diethyldithiocarbamate). Typical oxidants are chlorine and hydrogen peroxide:
2 R2NCSSNa + Cl2 → (R2NCSS)2 + 2 NaCl

Thiuram disulfides react with Grignard reagents to give esters of dithiocarbamic acid, as in the preparation of methyl dimethyldithiocarbamate:
[Me2NC(S)S]2  +  MeMgX   →   Me2NC(S)SMe  +  Me2NCS2MgX

The compounds feature planar dithiocarbamate subunits and are linked by an S−S bond of 2.00 Å. The C(S)−N bond is short (1.33 Å), indicative of multiple bonding. The dihedral angle between the two dithiocarbamate subunits approaches 90°.

Thiuram disulfides are weak oxidant. They can be reduced to dithiocarbamates. Treatment of thiuram disulfides with triphenylphosphine or cyanide salts gives the thiuram sulfide:
(R2NCSS)2 + PPh3 → (R2NCS)2S + SPPh3

Chlorination of the above-mentioned thiuram disulfide affords the thiocarbamoyl chloride.

Applications
The tetramethyl derivative, known as thiram, is a widely used fungicide. The tetraethyl derivative, known as disulfiram, is commonly used to treat chronic alcoholism. It produces an acute sensitivity to alcohol ingestion by blocking acetaldehyde dehydrogenase conversion of acetaldehyde leading to a higher concentration of the aldehyde in the blood producing symptoms of a severe hangover.

Safety
In 2005–06, thiuram mix was the 13th most prevalent allergen in patch tests (3.9%).

References